George Connor may refer to:

George Connor (racing driver) (1906–2001), American racecar driver
George Connor (American football) (1925–2003), American football player
George Connor (bishop) (born 1942), Anglican bishop in New Zealand
George Connor (priest) (1822–1883), Anglican Dean of Windsor
George Skeffington Connor (1810–1863), lawyer, judge and political figure in Canada West
George Connor (Australian politician) (1878–1941), member of the South Australian House of Assembly

See also
George O'Connor (disambiguation)